Communist Hungary may refer to:

Hungarian Soviet Republic (1919)
Hungarian Republic (1946–49)
Hungarian People's Republic (1949–89)